Queen's Park Football Club is a Scottish professional football club based in Glasgow, Scotland. Between 1867 and 1900, the first team competed in cup competitions. Between 1900 and 2013, the first team competed in the Scottish League and since 2013, in the Scottish Professional League. All players who have played in 100 or more such matches are listed below.

Records and notable players 
Ross Caven holds the record for the greatest number of appearances for Queen's Park, having made 594 between 1982 and 2002. As of 2016, two other players have made more than 500 appearances for Queen's Park – James Crawford and James McAlpine. The club's goalscoring record is held by James McAlpine, who scored 192 goals in 547 appearances between 1920 and 1934.

Current Queen's Park players who have made 100 or more appearances for the club are Willie Muir.

Key
Appearance and goal totals include matches in the Scottish League, Scottish Professional League, Scottish Cup, Scottish League Cup, Scottish Challenge Cup, Glasgow Cup, Glasgow Merchants Charity Cup, Glasgow League, Inter-City League, FA Cup, Spring Cup, Glasgow International Exhibition Cup, B Division Supplementary Cup, St Mungo Cup, Glasgow Dental Cup, Paisley Charity Cup, Ayr Charity Cup and Lord Provost's Unemployment Fund Tournament. Substitute appearances are included. Wartime matches (1939–1946) are regarded as unofficial and are excluded.
 "Queen's Park career" corresponds to the years in which the player made their first and last appearances.
 Players listed in bold won full international caps whilst with the club.
 Statistics are correct as of match played 15 May 2022.

Playing positions

Players

Pre-Scottish League era (1867–1900)

Early Scottish League era (1900–1919)

Interwar era (1919–1945)

Post-war era (1945–2000)

21st century (2000–present)

Notes

References

Queen's Park F.C. players
Queen's Park
Players
Association football player non-biographical articles
Players